The acyclic dependencies principle (ADP) is a software design principle defined by Robert C. Martin that states that "the dependency graph of packages or components should have no cycles".  This implies that the dependencies form a directed acyclic graph.

Example 

In this UML package diagram, package A depends on packages B and C. Package B in turn depends on package D, which depends on package C, which in turn depends on package B. The latter three dependencies create a cycle, which must be broken in order to adhere to the acyclic dependencies principle.

Types of dependencies 
Software dependencies can either be explicit or implicit.
Examples of explicit dependencies includes:
 Include statements, such as #include in C/C++, using in C# and import in Java.
 Dependencies stated in the build system (e.g. dependency tags in Maven configuration).

Examples of implicit dependencies includes:
 Relying on specific behaviour that is not well-defined by the interface exposed.
 Network protocols.
 Routing of messages over a software bus.

In general, it's considered good practice to prefer explicit dependencies whenever possible. This is because explicit dependencies are easier to map and analyze than implicit dependencies.

Cycle breaking strategies 
It is in general always possible to break a cyclic dependency chain. The two most common strategies are:
 Dependency inversion principle
 Create a new package, and move the common dependencies there.

See also 
 Package principles
 Circular dependency

References 

Software design